Kudrino is a rural locality (a village) in Baydarovskoye Rural Settlement, Nikolsky District, Vologda Oblast, Russia. The population was 62 as of 2002.

Geography 
Kudrino is located 25 km northeast of Nikolsk (the district's administrative centre) by road. Pelyaginets is the nearest rural locality.

References 

Rural localities in Nikolsky District, Vologda Oblast